The Batagaika crater is a thermokarst depression in the Chersky Range area. The biggest permafrost crater in the world, it administratively belongs to the Sakha Republic, Russia, and is in its Verkhoyansky District.

Description
The structure is named after the near-flowing Batagayka, a right tributary of the river Yana. The land began to sink due to the thawing permafrost in the 1960s after the surrounding forest was cleared. Flooding also contributed to the enlargement of the crater. Paleontologists have found Ice Age fossils buried in the mud around the rim of the crater. The rim is extremely unstable as there are regular landslides into the crater and the permafrost is constantly thawing. The crater is currently growing in size.

According to Mary Edwards of the University of Southampton, the process of erosion that increases the crater's size occurs in the following way:
Below the cliff face, steep hills and gullies drop to Batagaika's floor. As more of the material at the bottom of the slope melts and comes loose, a larger face is exposed to the air, which in turn increases the speed of permafrost thawing. The crater will likely eat through the entire hillslope before it slows down. Every year as soon as temperatures go above freezing, it's going to start happening again. Once you've exposed something like this, it's very hard to stop it.
According to research published in 2016, the crater wall has been growing by a yearly average of 10 meters per year over a ten-year observational period.

Fossils
The rapid expansion of the crater is uncovering a host of fossilized materials, including ancient forests and pollen and animal carcasses such as that of musk ox, mammoth and horse, along with other animals. It also allows for insight into 200,000 to 650,000 years of climate data.

References

External links
 Batagaika Crater Expands at NASA Earth Observatory, 27 April 2017.
Siberia's growing hole in the ground, BBC Reel (video, 4:48 min.), 27 July 2020.

Depressions of Russia
Periglacial landforms
Patterned grounds
Permafrost
Chersky Range